Maroc Soir is an evening Moroccan newspaper that is published in French-language.

History and profile
Maroc Soir was launched on 10 November 2005 by the publishing group of the same name, Maroc Soir Group, headed by Othman Al Omeir. The paper is the successor of the newspaper with the same name which was started in 1902. The headquarters of the paper is in Casablanca. The paper is published five times per week. The editor is Mahdi Harizi, a famous Moroccan writer and journalist.

The paper is published in tabloid format and consists of 24 full color pages. The newspaper has a pro-government stance.

References

External links
  Announcement of the launching

2005 establishments in Morocco
Newspapers established in 2005
Newspapers published in Morocco
French-language newspapers published in Morocco
Evening newspapers
Mass media in Casablanca